The Uruguayan Championship 1910 was the tenth official championship of Uruguayan football history.

Overview
The tournament consisted of a two-wheel championship of all against all. It involved nine teams, and the champion was River Plate F.C.

Teams

League standings

References
Uruguay - List of final tables (RSSSF)

Uruguayan Primera División seasons
Uru
1